Robert-Aloys Mooser (20 Septembre 1876 – 24 August 1969), was a Swiss musicologist and music critic. He is the author of reference works on the history of the music of Russia.

Life 
Born in Geneva, Mooser is the grandson of the famous organ builder Aloys Mooser (1770-1839). His father was a pianist and his mother, Julia Zapolskaya, was of Russian origin. He learned Russian as a child.  He learned music (piano and harmony) from his father and organ with Otto Barblan in Geneva. After his father's death in 1899, Mooser went to Russia and worked for ten years in St. Petersburg as a music critic for the French-language publication "Journal de Saint-Pétersbourg". He was also organist at the French Reformed Church, collected musical autographs and began long years of study of Russian music in the city archives. He also took lessons with Balakirev and Rimski-Korsakov.

In 1909, Mooser returned to Switzerland and until 1962 he was a music critic for the Geneva newspaper , and for some time its editor-in-chief. In 1915, he founded a cycle devoted to contemporary music, Les auditions du jeudi.

Mooser's articles for La Suisse have been collected in a four-volume publication, successively: Regards sur la musique contemporaine : 1921—1946, Panorama de la musique contemporaine : 1947–1953, Aspect de la musique contemporaine : 1953–1957 and Visage de la musique contemporaine : 1957–1961. In 1922, he founded and directed (until 1944) the musical review Dissonances, of which he was also editor.

His main works are Annales de la musique et des musiciens en Russie au xviiie s. (1951) and Visage de la musique contemporaine (1962), as well as numerous articles on various musicological themes. With Robert Godet, he translated the libretto of the opera Boris Godunov into French.

Homages 
In 1932, he was awarded the Silver Medal "Grateful Geneva" following the donation of his music archives to the Geneva Library..

Mooser died in geneva at the age of 92.

Publications 
 L'Opéra-comique français en Russie au XVIII : contribution à l'histoire de la musique russe, Genève, René Kistner 1932 ; 2nd edition, 1955 
 Violonistes-compositeurs italiens en Russie au XVIII, Milan 1938–1950
 Opéras, intermezzos, ballets, cantates, oratorios joués en Russie durant le XVIII, Geneva 1945 ; 2nd ed. Bärenreiter 1955 
 Regards sur la musique contemporaine : 1921—1946, Lausanne 1946 — preface by Arthur Honegger
 Annales de la musique et des musiciens en Russie au XVIII, 3 vols. Geneva, Mont-Blanc 1948–1951
 Des origines à la mort de Pierre III (1762) 
 L'époque glorieuse de Catherine II (1762-1796) , 
 Au XVIII, 1796-1801 
 Panorama de la musique contemporaine : 1947–1953, Genève 1953
 Aspect de la musique contemporaine : 1953–1957, Genève, Labor et fides 1957  — Preface by Émile Vuillermoz
 Visage de la musique contemporaine : 1957–1961, Paris, Éditions Julliard 1962
 Deux violonistes genevois, Gaspard Fritz (1716–1783) et Christian Haensel (1766–1850), Geneva,  1968
 Correspondance Ernest Ansermet, R.-Aloys Mooser : 1915-1969, Geneva, Georg 1983  — followed by  Hommage à Ernest Ansermet, by R.-Aloys Mooser (1969).
 Souvenirs : Genève 1886-1896, Saint-Pétersbourg 1896-1909, Geneva, Georg 1994

References

Bibliography 
 .
 The Russian life of R.-Aloys Mooser, music critic to the tsars : memoirs and selected writings. Traduit, édité et présenté par Mary S. Woodside & Neal Johnson. Edwin Mellen Press, 2008. 320 p.

External links 
 Manuscrits musicaux 231-579: inventaire
 Biographie sur le site de la bibliothèque de Genève

Swiss musicologists
20th-century musicologists
Swiss music critics
1876 births
1969 deaths
Writers from Geneva